The Baltimore Shakespeare Festival was a small nonprofit theatre that produced plays by or about Shakespeare in Baltimore, Maryland. It also had an educational program that introduced school children to Shakespeare.  The company existed, in different forms, from 1994 to 2010.

History 
The first production of BSF was A Midsummer Night's Dream which was performed at The Cloisters in Lutherville, Maryland in 1994. The company was founded by Kelley Dunn-Feliz and Richard Feliz that same year. In its early years, the Festival often faced financial instability, scaled back on its productions and went through several management changes.

In 2003, the festival moved to a permanent indoor space within the St Mary's Community Center in the Hampden neighborhood of North Baltimore.

The Baltimore Shakespeare Festival closed its doors for good in 2011.  The Board of Trustees made a simple public pronouncement of the difficulty of producing live theater and announced it was closing its doors due to economic challenges. The company did not maintain any archives.

Production history

1994
A Midsummer Night's Dream

1995
Romeo and Juliet

1997
Macbeth

1998
Twelfth Night

2000
Love for Words by Kimberley Lynne - Directed by Tony Tsendeas
I Hate Hamlet - Directed by Joseph Brady

2001
Much Ado About Nothing - Directed by Laura Hackman

2002-03
Cyrano de Bergerac - Directed by Joseph Brady
Hamlet - Directed by Laura Hackman

2003-04
As You Like It - Directed by Laura Hackman
Othello - Directed by Tony Tsendeas
Dickens of a Carol - Directed by Kathy Feininger
Teen Performance Program: Macbeth - Directed by Tony Tsendeas

2004-05
The Tempest - Directed by Laura Hackman
Julius Caesar - Directed by Tony Tsendeas
Dickens of a Carol - Directed by Kathy Feininger
Teen Performance Program: Love's Labour's Lost - Directed by Lewis Shaw

2005-06
 The Merry Wives of Windsor - Directed by Drew Kahl
Romeo and Juliet - Directed by Pat Diamond
Something Dickens This Way Comes - Directed and written by Kathy Feininger
Teen Performance Program: Hamlet - Directed by Tony Tsendeas
Rosencrantz and Guildenstern Are Dead - Directed by James Kinstle

2006-07
 A Midsummer Night's Dream - Directed by Laura Hackman
The Complete Works of William Shakespeare, Abridged - Directed by Tony Tsendeas
Desdemona, a Play About a Handkerchief by Paula Vogel - Directed by Raine Bode
Teen Performance Program: Much Ado About Nothing - Directed by Joan Weber
All's Well That Ends Well - Directed by Donald Hicken

2007-08
Macbeth - Directed by Tony Tsendeas
Antigone by Bertolt Brecht - Directed by Raine Bode
Teen Performance Program: The Comedy of Errors - Directed by Ian Belker
A Winter's Tale - Directed by Kathleen Akerley

2008-09
Twelfth Night - Directed by Laura Hackman
The Taming of the Shrew - Directed by Joseph Brady
Every Christmas Story Ever Told! - Directed and written by Michael Carleton
Teen Performance Program: The Tempest - Directed by Courtney Weber
Wittenberg - Directed by Tony Tsendeas

2009-10
Hamlet - Adapted and directed by Michael Carleton
Richard III - Directed by Michael Carleton
"Comedy of Errors" Directed by Joe Brady
"Scapin" Directed by Michael Carleton

References

Festivals in Baltimore
Shakespeare festivals in the United States